Óscar Coll Marengo (born September 1, 1928 in Buenos Aires, Argentina) was an Argentine footballer who played as a forward for clubs of Argentina, Chile and Spain.

Career
Raised in Avellaneda, Coll was the youngest of seven children, and he and his two brothers would each become professional footballers. His oldest brother Andrés played for Club Atlético Independiente and Racing Club de Avellaneda, while Norberto played for River Plate and Union Espanola of Chile. Óscar began with Club Atlético River Plate's reserve team playing in the fourth division before joining the first team as a right-side attacker (an extremo derecha).

Next, Coll joined Club Atlético Platense for three seasons before San Lorenzo de Almagro for the 1954–55 season. He would move to Spain after that season, joining RCD Espanyol.

Coll died aged 73.

Teams
 River Plate 1948–1950
 Platense 1951–1953
 San Lorenzo 1954–1955
 Espanyol 1956–1961
 Universidad de Chile 1962–1966

Honours
Universidad de Chile
 Chilean Championship: 1962, 1964 and 1965

References

 

1928 births
2001 deaths
Argentine footballers
Association football forwards
Argentina international footballers
Club Atlético Platense footballers
San Lorenzo de Almagro footballers
Club Atlético River Plate footballers
Universidad de Chile footballers
Chilean Primera División players
Argentine Primera División players
Argentine expatriate footballers
Argentine expatriate sportspeople in Chile
Expatriate footballers in Chile
Argentine expatriate sportspeople in Spain
Expatriate footballers in Spain
Footballers from Buenos Aires